Nedre Eggedal is a village in Sigdal municipality, Buskerud, Norway.

References

Villages in Buskerud